Sergio Alberto Montiel (October 20, 1927 – November 1, 2011) was an Argentinian politician, lawyer, and professor of constitutional law at the National University of the Littoral. Monitel served as Governor of Entre Ríos Province for two nonconsecutive terms: He was first elected on October 30, 1983, and served his first term until 1987. Montiel served a second gubernatorial term from 1999 to 2003. Montiel supported nationalization and opposed the 1993 Pact of Olivos.

Montiel was born in October 20, 1927, in Concepción del Uruguay, Argentina. He died of cardiac arrest at Militar de Paraná, a military hospital in Paraná, Entre Ríos, on November 1, 2011, at the age of 84.

He was an active freemason.

References

1927 births
2011 deaths
Governors of Entre Ríos Province
20th-century Argentine lawyers
Academic staff of the National University of the Littoral
People from Entre Ríos Province